Thomas Helbig (born 1967 in Rosenheim, West Germany) is an artist based in Berlin.

Helbig attended the Academy of Fine Arts, Munich and Goldsmiths, University of London, from 1989 to 1996.

He has shown work in many exhibitions including at Oldenburger Kunstverein, at the ICA in London and at Maschenmode in Berlin. He has also shown at galleries and museums such as Museum Abteiberg in Mönchengladbach, Danel Hug Gallery in Los Angeles and The Approach in London.  Helbig is represented by China Art Objects Gallery  ((https://web.archive.org/web/20101026014445/http://chinaartobjects.com/)), in Los Angeles, Galerie Ban Kaufmann , Munich and Galerie Guido W. Baudach , Berlin.

External links
Thomas Helbig at Guido W. Baudach
Thomas Helbig at Sorcha Dallas
Thomas Helbig – Saatchi Gallery
Thomas Helbig at Berliner Poster Verlag

Living people
1967 births
20th-century German painters
German male painters
21st-century German painters
21st-century German male artists
Academy of Fine Arts, Munich alumni
20th-century German sculptors
20th-century German male artists
German male sculptors